The Men's 5 km competition at the 2017 World Championships was held on 15 July 2017.

Results
The race was started at 10:00.

References

Men's 5 km